The mountain frog (Philoria kundagungan), or red and yellow mountain frog, is a species of frog in the family Limnodynastidae.  The scientific name comes from the Gubbi Gubbi language of southern Queensland, ‘kunda’ meaning mountain and ‘gungan’ meaning frog.

Location
It is endemic to Australia. Its natural habitats are subtropical or tropical moist lowland forests and rivers. Its habitat can be found in the areas of Queensland and New South Wales, Australia, but its distribution is severely fragmented. The mountain frog is known to be found on moist leaves and vegetation or they are also found near creeks or seepage areas.

Habitat
It is threatened by habitat loss. It is considered to be an endangered species. It is threatened by the process of logging. A lot of the species' habitat is being reserved and protected from timber harvesting. Also, disturbances from upstream that affect hydrological processes or water quality.

Sources

References

Philoria
Amphibians of Queensland
Amphibians of New South Wales
Amphibians described in 1975
Taxonomy articles created by Polbot
Frogs of Australia